Mirza Sayyed Hasan (b. 25 January 1655, Isfahan – before 27 December 1715) was a Safavid prince. He was the son of the high-ranking Iranian statesman Khalifeh Sultan, and the Safavid princess Khan-Agha Begum. In 1632, Mirza Sayyed, together with the rest of his three brothers, were blinded by Shah Safi (r. 1629–1642), who feared that his place was in danger from other Safavid royal members. Because of this, Mirza Sayyed was not able to occupy any post. He did, however, become one of the most dominant ulama of his time. At an unknown date, he married the Safavid princess Zobeydeh Khanum, who was the daughter of Shah Suleiman I (r. 1666–1694), and the sister of the later Shah Sultan Husayn (r. 1694-1722). She bore him Mirza Mohammad Baqer and Mir Sayyed Morteza, who both served as the sadr-i khasseh and sadr-i mamalik under their cousin Sultan Husayn.

References

Sources 
 
 

18th-century deaths
1655 births
Year of death uncertain
Khalifeh family
Safavid princes
People from Isfahan
Safavid theologians
17th-century Muslim scholars of Islam
17th-century people of Safavid Iran
18th-century people of Safavid Iran